"Footprints" is a jazz standard composed by saxophonist Wayne Shorter and first recorded for his album Adam's Apple in 1966. The first commercial release of the song was a different recording on the Miles Davis album Miles Smiles recorded later in 1966, but released earlier. It has become a jazz standard.

Rhythm

Drummer Tony Williams freely moves from swing, to the three-over-two cross rhythm—and to its  correlative. 

The ground of four main beats is maintained throughout the piece. Ron Carter’s  figure is known as tresillo in Afro-Cuban music and is the duple-pulse correlative of the  figure. This may have been the first overt expression of systemic, African-based cross-rhythm used by a straight ahead jazz group. During Davis’s first trumpet solo, Williams shifts to a  jazz ride pattern while Carter continues the  bass line. 

The slashed noteheads indicate the main beats (not bass notes), where one ordinarily taps their foot to "keep time."

Harmony
Harmonically, "Footprints" takes the form of a 12-bar C minor blues, but this is masked not only by its triple time signature but by its avant garde turnaround. In the key of C minor, a normal turnaround would be Dm7(5), G7, Cm7. But Shorter doubles the harmonic rhythm of the turnaround, and the progression reads: Fm7(5), F7(11), Eaug7(9), A7(9), Cm7. In jazz jam sessions and for educational purposes, players often choose D7(11) D7(11) Cm7 as turnaround, which also fits with the original melody.

References

1966 compositions